Galax is a flowering plant—also known as the wandplant or beetleweed. 

Galax may also refer to:
 Galax, Virginia, United States
 Galax High School
 Galax Commercial Historic District
 Galax Saint Petersburg, a former Russian soccer team
 GALAX, a computer hardware brand of Palit Microsystems

See also
Galaxy (disambiguation)